FCL Lootos is an Estonian women's association football club from Põlva. The club plays in Naiste Meistriliiga, the first level in the Estonian women's football system.

History
The team was founded in 2008. FC Lootos only had girls team (under 16 age group), so when girls reached the age of 16, they were forced to leave the club. This new team took the name Põlva F.C. Lootos and played their home games at Lootospark, located in Põlva.
It took just one season to gain promotion to the Naiste Meistriliiga, when the club won the Naiste Esiliiga in 2008 under the management of Kaido Kukli and Indrek Käo. From 2009, team played five seasons in Naiste Meistriliiga. After finishing 5th in 2013, club's top goal scoring forward Signy Aarna left the club to play professional football at Finnish team Pallokissat. Club started program for changing players generation and left Meistriliiga. Once more it took just one season to gain promotion to the Naiste Esiliiga, when the club won the Naiste Teine liiga in the 2014. Season 2015 was most successful ever when club reached the final of the Estonian Cups after a 2–1 semi-final win over Levadia at the Lootospark. Allegros were beaten 11–0 by current cup holders Pärnu in the final at the A Le Coq Arena in Tallinn. Team went on to win 2nd place the 2016 Naiste Esiliiga and automatic promotion to the Naiste Meistriliiga, ending their three-year stint in the lower divisions. On the season 2017 team was finishing on the 7th place and 1-1, 0-0 draws against Nõmme Kalju FC on the promotional round secured place on Naiste Meistriliiga for another season. Season 2018 started with Lootos suffering one of the worst results in their history. Losing at first their homeground Lootospark (not qualified for high level football standards) team played first seven games on away grounds and lose all of them. New home ground Tilsi staadion ( out of Põlva) helps team a lot to secure place on Naiste Meistriliiga for clubs 25th anniversary season 2019 and end the season in 6th place. In the difficult 2020 season the team finished with highest 5th places in the Naiste Meistriliiga. The 1st place was won in the Fair Play competition. For the first time in club history, the team were voted the best team in Põlva County. In 2021, the team repeated its result, finishing fifth in the Naiste Meistriliiga.

Current technical staff

Current squad
 As of 31 March 2021.

Reserve team
 As of 31 October 2019.

Out on loan

Season by season

References

Women's football clubs in Estonia
Põlva Parish